The 1894 Hillsdale Dales football team was an American football team that represented Hillsdale College in the 1894 college football season.  The Dales compiled a 3–3 record overall with a 1–2 mark in the Michigan Intercollegiate Athletic Association (MIAA) and outscored their opponents 158 to 58.

Schedule

Second team schedule

References

Hillsdale
Hillsdale Chargers football seasons
Hillsdale Dales football